Love God. Love People.: The London Sessions is an album released by gospel singer Israel Houghton. It was released in 2010.

Production and recording
Love God. Love People.: The London Sessions was produced by Houghton with longtime collaborator Aaron W. Lindsey, and Tommy Sims. Houghton, Lindsey, and Sims also co-wrote five of the songs, including the first gospel single, "You Hold My World", which was nominated for a Dove Award. Three additional songs were penned by Houghton and his wife Meleasa."

The album was recorded and engineered by Danny Duncan at Abbey Road Studios in London."

Track listing
"Love God Love People" – 4:49
"Yahweh (The Lifter)" – 3:57
"Love Rev" – 5:23
"That's Why I Love You" – 6:26
"Others" – 5:13
"You Hold My World" – 6:38
"You Won't Let Go" – 3:01
"Our God" – 4:59
"Mercies" (featuring Kirk Franklin) – 4:21
"Surprises" (featuring Fred Hammond) – 7:26
"Name of Love" – 6:37
"Hosanna (Be Lifted Higher)" – 8:33
"Love God Love People (Incorporated Elements Remix)" (Bonus track) – 4:45

Personnel
Israel Houghton: Lead Vocals, Background Vocals, Acoustic Guitars
Aaron Lindsey: Keys, B3, Piano, Bass, Upright Piano, Drum Programming, Background Vocals, Hype Vocals
Akil Thompson: Electric Guitars
Teddy Campbell: Drums
Tommy Sims: Drum Programming, Keys, Bass, B3, WTLS DJ, old man voice sample
Michael Gungor: Nylon Guitar, Acoustic Guitars, Electric Guitars
Javier Solis: Percussion
Dan Needham: Drums, Field Snare, Programming
Fred Hammond: Bass on Surprises
The London Session Orchestra: Strings
Eriway: Saluang, Bansi Flutes
New Breed (Daniel Johnson, Erica King, Charlin Moore, Lois Duplessis, Krystle Harper, Jeremiah Woods, Chris Lawson, Shawn Flowers): Background Vocals

Awards
In 2011, the album was awarded a Grammy as the Best Pop/Contemporary Gospel Album at the 53rd Grammy Awards. It also won a Dove Award for Contemporary Gospel Album of the Year at the 42nd GMA Dove Awards, while the song "You Hold My World" was nominated for Contemporary Gospel Recorded Song of the Year.

References

External links 
Israel & New Breed - Official Website 
Fusemix.com - Israel Houghton - Love God. Love People Cd Review

2010 albums
Contemporary worship music albums
Grammy Award for Best Pop/Contemporary Gospel Album
Israel Houghton albums